The Aye Formation is a geologic formation in the Dinant synclinorium, Ardennes, Belgium. It is part of the Condroz Group, at the base of the middle Famennian (Upper Devonian). It is characterized by the presence of a conodont fossil Palmatolepis rhomboidea.

It is composed mostly of greenish shales and siltstones with some lenses of sandstone. As it formed in an offshore position, in a subtidal wave-influenced environment, bioturbation features are significant. Cross-bedding structures also occur.

The stratotype is located in the area of Houyet and Aye in Belgium.

References 

Geology of Belgium
Devonian System of Europe
Famennian Stage
Sandstone formations
Shale formations
Siltstone formations
Shallow marine deposits